Nathan Bonner-Evans is a Wales A international rugby union player. A number 8 forward, he has played for Ospreys and for Sale Sharks. In December 2008 he signed for London Welsh RFC. In the 2005–2006 season, Bonner-Evans made 11 appearances as Sale Sharks won their first ever Premiership title.

References

External links
Sale profile

1978 births
Living people
Welsh rugby union players
Rugby union players from Swansea
Ospreys (rugby union) players
Sale Sharks players
London Welsh RFC players
Rugby union number eights